Armeni is the archaeological site of an ancient Minoan cemetery on Crete, roughly eight kilometers south of the modern town of Rethymnon.

Site
Armeni has been under excavation since 1969 by Dr. Yiannis Tzedakis.  Over 200 chamber tombs and one tholos tomb have been found. All date to the Late Minoan era.

The chambers are approached by entrance passages, or dromos, which start at ground level and descend to the entrance of the tomb. The tombs are not identical, with some having ramps while others have stairs. The walls of the dromos have been cut in such a way that they are closer to each other at the top than they are at the bottom, probably to help bear the weight of the earth above. The entrances were originally covered by a large stone, which is usually still next to the entrance. Several of the larger tombs have a pillar in the center of the chamber. One tomb's walls are lined with stone benches cut directly from the rock.

Artifacts 
Artifacts from the chamber tombs include seal stones, jewelry, bronze tools, stone vases, bronze vessels and pottery. Clay larnakes, a type of small coffin, painted with double axes, hunting scenes, and Horns of Consecration were also excavated. These artifacts can be found at the Archaeological Museum of Chania and the Rethymno Museum.

Over 500 skeletons have been excavated, yielding useful information about the diet of the Minoan people in this area.  They ate high carbohydrate diets but not much meat.

Tourism
The site is open to tourists, including entrance into several of the main rock-cut tombs. Automatic lighting has been installed. There is an entrance fee of €3.

References

 Swindale, Ian "Armeni" Retrieved 11 May 2013.
 Myers, J.W., Myers, E.E. and Cadogan, G. "Achladia" The Aerial Atlas of Ancient Crete 
 L. Godart and Y. Tzedakis: ‘Temoignages archéologiques et épigraphiques en Crète occidentale du Néolithique au Minoen Récent III B’ Incunabula Graeca 93 (1992)

External links

 http://www.minoancrete.com/armeni.htm Photos and video of the site. Retrieved 12 May 2013.

Rethymno (regional unit)
Minoan sites in Crete
Ancient cemeteries in Greece
Rock-cut tombs